Aldo Gustavo Paredes (born 7 February 1972 in Formosa) is a retired Argentine footballer who played as a midfielder.

Paredes came through the youth team at Boca Juniors to make his professional debut in a 3–0 away win over Racing Club in 1994. He only played six league matches for the club.

In 1995, he joined Ferro Carril Oeste where he played 66 matches over the next two seasons before joining San Lorenzo in 1997.

Paredes enjoyed the most successful part of his career with San Lorenzo, he was part of the team that won the Clausura 2001 championship. He also won two international championships with the club, the 2001 Copa Mercosur and the 2002 Copa Sudamericana, He played a total of 264 games in 9 years with San Lorenzo, putting him in 9th place on the list of all-time appearances for the club.

In 2006, he joined Quilmes for the 2006–07 season but the club finished bottom of the Apertura and the Clausura and were relegated. The following season, he played for Almagro of the 2nd division and he then joined Independiente Rivadavia in 2008.

Titles

External links
 San Lorenzo micro-profile
 Argentine Primera statistics

1972 births
Living people
People from Formosa, Argentina
Argentine footballers
Association football midfielders
Argentine Primera División players
Boca Juniors footballers
Ferro Carril Oeste footballers
San Lorenzo de Almagro footballers
Quilmes Atlético Club footballers
Club Almagro players
Independiente Rivadavia footballers